Cyperus kibweanus is a species of sedge that is native to parts of tropical Africa.

See also 
 List of Cyperus species

References 

kibweanus
Plants described in 1963
Flora of the Democratic Republic of the Congo